Coleophora kuehnella is a moth of the family Coleophoridae. It was first described by Johann Goeze in 1783 and is found in Asia and Europe.

Description
The wingspan is 14–17 mm. The moth flies from May to July depending on the location.

The larvae feed on oak (Quercus species), and supposedly also Prunus and willow (Salix species). Full-grown larvae live in a black pistol case of about 8 mm, with a mouth angle of about 90°. The case is covered by a silken mantle that hangs from its rear end, and almost covers the case. The larvae mine the leaf from the underside, making many, unusually small fleckmines. Full-grown larvae can be found in early June.

Distribution
It is found in Europe (from Italy, across Central Europe up to Southern Scandinavia), the Caucasus and Turkey.

References

External links

 Swedish Moths

kuehnella
Moths described in 1783
Moths of Asia
Moths of Europe
Taxa named by Johann August Ephraim Goeze